Claude de Lorraine (5 June 1578 – 24 January 1657), also called Claude de Guise, was a French noble and husband of Marie de Rohan.  He was the Duke of Chevreuse, a title which is today used by the Duke of Luynes.

Biography
He was the third son of Henry I, Duke of Guise and Catherine de Clèves.
Prince of Joinville, he is made Duke of Chevreuse and peer of France by Louis XIII in 1611, Grand Chamberlain of France in 1621 and Grand Falconer of France in 1622.

According to Agnes Strickland he stood as proxy for Charles I of England in his marriage at Notre Dame to Henrietta Maria on 1 May 1625: in the same year Charles I made him a Knight in the Order of the Garter.

Marriage and issue
In 1622, he married Princess Marie de Rohan, who was 22 years younger than himself.
They had 3 daughters:

 Anne Marie de Lorraine (1624–1652), abbesse of Pont-aux-Dames.
 Charlotte Marie de Lorraine (1627–1652), Mademoiselle de Chevreuse, lover of Jean François Paul de Gondi, cardinal de Retz.
 Henriette de Lorraine (1631–1693), abbesse of Jouarre.

He lived with his family in the Château de Dampierre, near Chevreuse.

He commissioned the royal architect, Clément Métezeau, to design a Parisian townhouse, the Hôtel de Chevreuse, constructed 1622–1623 on the Rue Saint-Thomas-du-Louvre on a site now part of the Cour Napoléon of the Louvre.

Living an inconspicuous life, Claude succeeded in distancing himself from his wife's plotting (as a favorite of Queen Anne of Austria she was involved in many political intrigues at the court of King Louis XIII of France).

He died without a male heir in 1657.

References

House of Guise
House of Lorraine
Princes of Joinville
Princes of Lorraine
Chevreuse, Claude de Lorraine duc de
Chevreuse, Claude de Lorraine duc de
Chevreuse, Claude de Lorraine duc de
Dukes of Chevreuse
Peers created by Louis XIII
French hunters